The following lists events that happened during the year 1997 in Bosnia and Herzegovina.

Incumbents
Presidency:
Alija Izetbegović
Krešimir Zubak 
Momčilo Krajišnik
Prime Minister: Hasan Muratović (until January 3), Haris Silajdžić (starting January 3)

 
Years of the 20th century in Bosnia and Herzegovina
1990s in Bosnia and Herzegovina
Bosnia and Herzegovina
Bosnia and Herzegovina